ICMM may refer to:

 International Committee of Military Medicine
 International Congress of Maritime Museums
 International Council on Mining and Metals
Indo Ceylon Merger Movement (Inththiya Ilanggai Innaippu Iyakkam), a Sri Lankan Tamil militant group